Streptomyces kronopolitis is a bacterium species from the genus of Streptomyces which has been isolated from the millipede Kronopolites svenhedind from the Fenghuang Mountain in China.Streptomyces kronopolitis produces phoslactomycins.

See also 
 List of Streptomyces species

References

External links
Type strain of Streptomyces kronopolitis at BacDive -  the Bacterial Diversity Metadatabase

 

kronopolitis
Bacteria described in 2016